Andreyevsky (masculine), Andreyevskaya (feminine), or Andreyevskoye (neuter) may refer to:
Andreyevsky (surname), Slavic last name
Andreyevsky (rural locality) (Andreyevskaya, Andreyevskoye), several rural localities in Russia
Andreyevsky Bridge, a historical bridge in Moscow, Russia demolished in 1998